In the 1986 Intertoto Cup no knock-out rounds were contested, and therefore no winner was declared.

Group stage
The teams were divided into twelve groups of four teams each.

Group 1

Group 2

Group 3

Group 4

Group 5

Group 6

Group 7

Group 8

Group 9

Group 10

Group 11

Group 12

See also
 1986–87 European Cup
 1986–87 European Cup Winners' Cup
 1986–87 UEFA Cup

External links
  by Pawel Mogielnicki

1986
4